2000–01 Belarusian Cup was the tenth season of the Belarusian annual football cup competition. Contrary to the league season, it is conducted in a fall-spring rhythm. The first games were played on 14 June 2000.

First round
The games were played on 14 June 2000. Khimik Svetlogorsk advanced to the next round by a drawing of lots.

Round of 32
The games were played in July 2000. Winners of the previous round were drawn against Premier League clubs. Two Premier League clubs (Gomel and Shakhtyor Soligorsk) advanced to the next round by a drawing of lots.

Round of 16
The games were played on 2 October 2000.

Quarterfinals
The first legs were played on 20 April 2001. The second legs were played on 2 May 2001.

|}

First leg

Second leg

Semifinals
The first legs were played on 10 May 2001. The second legs were played on 18 May 2001.

|}

First leg

Second leg

Final

External links
RSSSF

Belarusian Cup seasons
Belarusian Cup
Cup
Cup